RK Gračanica is a professional handball club from Gračanica, Bosnia and Herzegovina. The club competes in the Handball Championship of Bosnia and Herzegovina, and the EHF European Cup.

History
The club was founded in 1956, and started competing in 1958.

Sponsorship naming

The club has had several denominations through the years due to sponsorship:
 Gračanica FERING (1998/99)
 Gračanica INDEX (2001/02)

Honours

Domestic competitions 
Handball Championship of Bosnia and Herzegovina: 
 Winners (1): 2001
First League of Federation of Bosnia and Herzegovina – North: 
 Winners (1): 2017/18

European record

Recent seasons

The recent season-by-season performance of the club:

Key

References

External links
 

Bosnia and Herzegovina handball clubs
Handball clubs established in 1956
1956 establishments in Bosnia and Herzegovina
Tuzla Canton